Dominik Kraihamer (born 29 November 1989 in Oberndorf) is an Austrian racing driver, who competes in the FIA World Endurance Championship for ByKolles Racing Team.

Career
Kraihamer's racing career began in 2004 in karting, where he found success in the Rotax Max Challenge in his native Austria. In 2008 he was runner-up in the Rotax Max Euro Challenge DD2, and fourth in the grand finals. 2008 also saw the start of his car racing career, contesting the FIA GT3 European Championship in a Lamborghini Gallardo for S-Berg Racing.

In 2009 Kraihamer competed in Formula Le Mans, finishing 13th for Boutsen Energy Racing. The following year he improved to finish fifth in the standings. For 2011 he stepped up to LMP2 with the Boutsen team, finishing fifth in the Le Mans Series. He also made his 24 Hours of Le Mans debut driving an LMP2 Oreca.

In 2012 Kraihamer raced in the LMP1 category of the FIA World Endurance Championship, driving for OAK Racing.

Racing record

24 Hours of Le Mans results

Complete FIA World Endurance Championship results

* Season still in progress.

References

External links

Career statistics at Driver Database

1989 births
Living people
People from Salzburg-Umgebung District
Austrian racing drivers
European Le Mans Series drivers
24 Hours of Le Mans drivers
FIA World Endurance Championship drivers
24 Hours of Spa drivers
Sportspeople from Salzburg (state)
Oreca drivers
OAK Racing drivers
Kolles Racing drivers
Rebellion Racing drivers
Boutsen Ginion Racing drivers